Arunachal languages are various languages in Arunachal Pradesh, India traditionally classified as Sino-Tibetan languages, but that may possibly language isolates and independent language families according to some scholars. Blench (2011) proposed four language isolates (Hruso, Miji, Miju, and Puroik) and three independent families (Mishmic, Kamengic, and Siangic). However, this is disputed by Anderson (2014) and others, who consider them to be primary branches of Sino-Tibetan rather than as isolates or independent language phyla.

Arunachal families
Hrusish languages
Hruso
Miji languages: Bangru, Eastern Miji, Western Miji
Kho-Bwa languages
Puroik: diverse dialects
Bugun
Western Kho-Bwa
Sherdukpen, Sartang
Chug (Duhumbi), Lish (Khispi)
Siangic languages
Koro
Milang
Miju languages
Miju (Kman)
Meyor (Zakhring)
Digaro languages
Idu
Taraon

See also
Mishmi languages

References

Languages of India
Sino-Tibetan languages
Proposed language families